Spoken is the past participle form of "to speak".

Spoken may also refer to:
Spoken (band), a Christian rock group from Arkansas
Spoken (album), an album by Spoken

See also
Speak (disambiguation)